Colin Hunt may refer to:

 Colin Hunt (character), a character on The Fast Show
 Colin Hunt (basketball), British basketball player